Ehime Mbano is a local government area in Imo State, Nigeria. 

The postal code of the area is 472.

The mission statement of the local government area is for grass root development.

References

Local Government Areas in Imo State
Towns in Imo State
Local Government Areas in Igboland